George Henry Rooke, D.D. (3 August 1702 – 7 February 1754) was an English priest and academic in the eighteenth century.

Rooke was born in Carlisle. He was educated at Christ's College, Cambridge, graduating B.A. in 1725 and MA in 1728. He became Fellow of Christ's in 1727; and was Master from 1745 until his death. He was Vice-Chancellor of the University of Cambridge from 1745 to 1746. He held livings in Cambridge, Great Eversden, Little Abington, Foxton, Hadstock and Great Horkesley.

References 

1754 deaths
1702 births
18th-century English Anglican priests
Alumni of Christ's College, Cambridge
Fellows of Christ's College, Cambridge
Masters of Christ's College, Cambridge
People from Carlisle, Cumbria
Vice-Chancellors of the University of Cambridge